Lompret is a village of Wallonia and a district of the municipality of Chimay, located in the province of Hainaut, Belgium. 

It was a municipality of its own until January 1, 1977.

Lompret is a member of the Les Plus Beaux Villages de Wallonie ("The Most Beautiful Villages of Wallonia") association.

References

External links

Former municipalities of Hainaut (province)
Chimay